Mahbubur Rahman Sufil is a Bangladeshi footballer who plays as a forward. He currently plays for Bangladesh Premier League side Mohammedan SC and the Bangladesh national team.

He played for Arambagh KS in the Bangladesh Football Premier League. He was the captain of the club for 2017–2018 season.

Club career

Arambagh KS
Sufil was the captain of Arambagh KS for the 2017–18 season. He led the club to its first-ever local title in its almost 60-year history, beating defending champions Chittagong Abahani in the final of the 2017–18 Independence Cup by a 2-0 margin on 10 February 2018 at the Bangabandhu National Stadium in Dhaka.

Bashundhara Kings
Sufil joined the Bashundhara Kings from Arambagh KS on 1 July 2018. On 5 February 2021, Sufil scored his first goal for the club during a 2-1 victory over Chittagong Abahani Limited.

International career

Youth
Sufil appeared for the national under-20 side in both the 2017 SAFF U-18 Championship and 2018 AFC U-19 Championship qualification. He scored three goals in AFC qualification, including a brace in a 4–0 victory over Sri Lanka and the game-winner in stoppage time against the Maldives. During the 2017 SAFF U-18 Championship, Sufil scored one goal, the game-tying tally in a 4–3 shock victory over tournament favorites India in the tournament's opening match.

Senior team
Sufil made his senior international debut on 27 March 2018 in an International friendly against Laos. He entered the match as a second-half substitute before scoring the game-tying goal in the third minute of stoppage time. In warm-up matches for the friendly against Laos, Sufil scored a goal against Bangkok Glass FC of Thai League 1 during a training camp in Thailand.

International goals

Youth

Senior
Score and result list Bangladesh's goal tally first.

Club
Bashundhara Kings

References

External links

Living people
1999 births
Bangladeshi footballers
Bangladesh international footballers
People from Moulvibazar District
Association football forwards
Footballers at the 2018 Asian Games
Arambagh KS players
Bashundhara Kings players
Mohammedan SC (Dhaka) players
Asian Games competitors for Bangladesh
Bangladesh Football Premier League players
South Asian Games bronze medalists for Bangladesh
South Asian Games medalists in football